The Adventures of Jodelle (original title Les Aventures de Jodelle) is a 1966 French erotic comic drawn by Guy Peellaert and scripted by Pierre Bartier. Drawings and screenplay were deeply influenced by pop art. Many of the characters looks were taken from public pop figures of the past and present; Jodelle herself looks like French singer Sylvie Vartan, stereotyped as the girl next door fiancée, while other characters are look-alikes of Emperor Augustus, The Beatles, Pope Paul VI, James Bond, Marquis de Sade, Frank Lloyd Wright's architecture of the Solomon R. Guggenheim Museum, and Jesus Christ. In a Pop version of Imperial Rome, neon ads promote "stripteases and Christian slaughters."

Influence
Jodelle was the first pop art book by Peellaert, followed up by Pravda (never published in English), one year later. Peellaerts comics were published by Éric Losfelds Le Terrain Vague, just like the Barbarella comic. A somewhat likeminded comic book that appeared was Phoebe Zeit-Geist.

See also
Vanity of vanities, all is vanity
Tarzoon: Shame of the Jungle

Notes

References

Favari, Pietro (1996) Le nuvole parlanti: un secolo di fumetti tra arte e mass media 
Laterza, Rossella and Vinella, Marisa (1980) Le donne di carta: personaggi femminili nella storia del fumetto 

Adult comic strips
Erotic comics
Belgian comic strips
Bandes dessinées
Literature related to the sexual revolution
1966 comics debuts
Comics characters introduced in 1966
Belgian comics characters
Comics about women
Jodelle